Szarek may refer to:

Szarek, Ełk County, village in Warmian-Masurian Voivodeship, Poland
Szarek, Gołdap County, village in Warmian-Masurian Voivodeship, Poland
Szarek (surname)

See also